Iulian Baltag (born 1 July 1986) is a Moldovan chess player who holds the title of International Master (IM, 2011). He three times won Moldovan Chess Championship (2012, 2020, 2021) and twice won Cypriot Chess Championship (2006, 2007).

Biography 
Iulian Baltag is a multiple participant of the Moldovan chess championships. In this tournaments he won three gold (2012, 2020, 2021) and bronze (2022) medals.

Also he twice in row won Cypriot Chess Championships: in 2006 and 2007.

Iulian Baltag played for Moldova in the Chess Olympiads:
 In 2012, at reserve board in the 40th Chess Olympiad in Istanbul (+1, =2, -1),
 In 2022, at fourth board in the 44th Chess Olympiad in Chennai (+3, =3, -1).

In 2011, he was awarded the FIDE International Master (IM) title.

References

External links 

1986 births
Living people
Chess International Masters
Moldovan chess players